

Aces
This list is complete. Notable aces are linked to their biographies.

References 

Victories, 08